The 1989 South Australian Open also known as the Australian Hard Court Championships was a men's Grand Prix tennis circuit tournament played on outdoor hard courts at the Memorial Drive Park in Adelaide, Australia and was part of the 1989 Nabisco Grand Prix. The tournament was held from 2 January through 9 January 1989. Fourth-seeded Mark Woodforde won his second consecutive singles title at the event.

Finals

Singles

 Mark Woodforde defeated  Patrik Kühnen 7–5, 1–6, 7–5
 It was Woodforde's 1st title of the year and the 5th of his career.

Doubles

 Neil Broad /  Stefan Kruger defeated  Mark Kratzmann /  Glenn Layendecker 6–2, 7–6
 It was Broad's 1st title of the year and the 1st of his career. It was Kruger's only title of the year and the 1st of his career.

References

External links
 ITF tournament edition details